The 1952 United States Senate special election in Kentucky was held on November 4, 1952, to complete the unexpired term of the late Senator Virgil Chapman. Interim Senator Thomas R. Underwood ran to complete the term but was defeated by Republican former Senator John Sherman Cooper.

Background
Incumbent Senator Virgil Chapman died on March 8, 1951. Governor Lawrence Wetherby appointed Thomas R. Underwood to fill the vacant seat until a successor could be duly elected. The special election was scheduled for November 4, 1952, concurrent with the general election for President and United States House of Representatives.

General election

Candidates
John Sherman Cooper, U.S. State Department official and former Senator (1946–1949)
Thomas R. Underwood, interim U.S. Senator since 1951

Results

See also
1952 United States Senate elections

Notes

References 

1952 (special)
Kentucky
United States Senate
Kentucky 1952
Kentucky 1952
United States Senate 1952